Technological University, Taunggyi is situated in Ayetharyar township, Taunggyi District, Shan State, Myanmar. The university is run by Ministry of Education (Myanmar).It was established in 1992 as Government Technical Institute and was upgraded to Technical College in 1997 and finally it was upgraded to University level in 2007 and it is known as Technological University, Taunggyi. The school has 84.482 acres wide. Yearly average graduation students are about 500 students.

The university offers bachelor and diploma programs for these fields:
Civil Engineering
Electronic and Communication
Electrical Power
Mechanical Engineering
Mining Engineering
Biotechnology
Information Technology

See also 
Technological University, Lashio

Technological University, Loikaw

Technological University, Panglong

Technological University, Kyaingtong

List of Technological Universities in Myanmar

External links 

Universities and colleges in Shan State
Technological universities in Myanmar